This is a list of notable roots reggae musicians, singers and producers.

A
The Abyssinians
Laurel Aitken
Alborosie
Alpha & Omega
Roland Alphonso
Bob Andy
Horace Andy
Anthony B
Antidoping
Bryan Art
Aswad

B
Macka B
Buju Banton
Beshara
Big Youth
Black Uhuru
Khady Black
Black Roots
Black Slate
Everton Blender
Alpha Blondy
Yami Bolo
Ken Boothe
Peter Broggs
Mike Brooks
Barry Brown        
Dennis Brown
Burning Spear
Bushman

C
Al Campbell
Pete Campbell
Icho Candy
Capleton
Don Carlos
Lacksley Castell
Charly B
Chezidek
Chronixx
Johnny Clarke
Jimmy Cliff
Cocoa Tea
Colle´ Kharis
The Congos
Count Ossie
Cultura Profética
Culture

D
Ronnie Davis
Ossie Dellimore
Desmond Dekker
Dezarie
Dillinger
Dr Alimantado
Eric Donaldson
Mikey Dread
Dry & Heavy
Lucky Dube

E
Earl Sixteen
Eek a mouse
Alton Ellis
The Ethiopians

F
Majek Fashek
Clinton Fearon

G
Gentleman
The Gladiators
Gondwana
Marcia Griffiths
Groundation
Gyptian

H
Half Pint
Pam Hall
Beres Hammond
The Heptones
Joe Higgs
Errol Holt
John Holt
Hornsman Coyote singer of Eyesburn

I
I-Roy
I-Wayne
Gregory Isaacs
Israel Vibration
The Itals

J
Jah Cure
Jah Roots
Jah Shaka
John Brown's Body
Anthony Johnson
Roydel Johnson

K
Ini Kamoze
Katchafire
Junior Kelly
King Tubby
Kiddus I
Knowledge

L
Eric "Bingy Bunny" Lamont
Ijahman Levi
Barrington Levy
Aura Lewis
Little Roy
Jah Lloyd
Fred Locks
Jimmy London
Luciano

M
David Madden
Bob Marley
Bob Marley & the Wailers
Rita Marley
Damian Marley
Julian Marley
Ky-Mani Marley
Stephen Marley
Ziggy Marley
Skip Marley
Jah Mason
The Maytones
Winston McAnuff
Freddie McGregor
Freddie McKay
Me & You
The Meditations
The Melodians
Peter Metro
Midnite
The Mighty Diamonds
Mighty Mystic
Jacob Miller
Sugar Minott
Misty in Roots
Jackie Mittoo
Fantan Mojah
Morgan Heritage
The Morwells
Pablo Moses
Judy Mowatt
Hugh Mundell
Junior Murvin
Mutabaruka
Cedric Myton
Mikey Dread

N
Nasio
New Kingston
No-Maddz

O
Johnny Osbourne

P
Addis Pablo
Augustus Pablo
Frankie Paul
Perfect
Lee Scratch Perry
Pressure
Prince Alla
Prince Far I
Michael Prophet
Protoje

Q
Queen Ifrica
Queen Omega

R
The Rastafarians
Tony Rebel
Danny Red
Junior Reid
Rhythm & Sound
Jimmy Riley
Tarrus Riley
Max Romeo
Roots Radics
Michael Rose
The Royals
Devon Russell
Richie Spice

S
Sanchez
Scientist
Garnett Silk
The Silvertones
Sister Carol
Sizzla
The Skatalites
Sly & Robbie
Leroy Smart
Smiley Culture
SOJA
Richie Spice
Steel Pulse

T
Judah Eskender Tafari
Rod Taylor
Tenor Saw
Third World
Lincoln Thompson
Linval Thompson
Toots & the Maytals
Peter Tosh
Tribal Seeds
Turbulence
Twinkle Brothers

U
U-Roy
The Upsetters
The Viceroys

W
Bunny Wailer
The Wailing Souls

Y
Yabby You

Z
Zap Pow

References

Lists of musicians by genre